William Henry Cook (12 January 191029 January 1985) was an Australian jockey.

Career
Billy earned the nickname "Last-Race Cookie" following his riding of the winner in the last race 13 Saturdays in succession in Sydney.  He was also known as "The Champ", due to his exquisite riding skills.

He won six Sydney jockeys' premierships during a distinguished career riding in Australia and overseas.

Some of the achievements during his career included winning the 1941 and 1945 Melbourne Cups (Skipton and Rainbird), the 1930 Caulfield Cup (Amounis), the 1953 Sydney Cup (Carioca), and the 1954 CB Fisher Plate (Rising Fast).

Perhaps his most famous victory was defeating Phar Lap on Mollison in the 1929 Chelmsford Stakes.

Retirement
He officially retired from riding in 1959. His son Peter was also a successful jockey.

Death
Cook died in 1985 and was posthumously inducted in the Australian Racing Hall of Fame in 2002.

Further reading
 Brasch, D. (2011). Jockeying to the top: the story of horseracing legend Peter Cook. New Holland Publishers. 
 Pollard, J. (1988). Australian Horse Racing. Angus & Robertson Publishers.

External links
 Australian Racing Museum and Hall of Fame Champions – Billy Cook
 Australian Dictionary of Biography - William Henry (Billy) Cook

1910 births
1985 deaths
Australian jockeys
Australian Thoroughbred Racing Hall of Fame inductees
Sport Australia Hall of Fame inductees
20th-century Australian people